The Ile du Golfe is a limestone island located close to the south-western coast of Tasmania, Australia. The long, narrow dolphin-shaped  island is part of the Maatsuyker Islands Group, and comprises part of the Southwest National Park and the Tasmanian Wilderness World Heritage Site.

Fauna
The island is part of the Maatsuyker Island Group Important Bird Area, identified as such by BirdLife International because of its importance as a breeding site for seabirds. Recorded breeding seabird and wader species are the little penguin, short-tailed shearwater (134,000 pairs), fairy prion (356,000 pairs), Pacific gull, silver gull, sooty oystercatcher and black-faced cormorant.  The swamp antechinus has been recorded.  Reptiles present include the Tasmanian tree skink, metallic skink and three-lined skink.

See also

 South East Cape
 South West Cape
 List of islands of Tasmania

References

Protected areas of Tasmania
Important Bird Areas of Tasmania
Islands of South West Tasmania